Kingsley Ogwudire (born January 20, 1972) is a Nigerian professional basketball player, formerly with the Harlem Globetrotters, Antranik SC of Beirut, Lebanon, Al-Ittihad of Syria. He played college basketball at Montana State University-Northern in 1996-97.  He is also a longtime member of the Nigeria national basketball team, including appearances at the 1998 FIBA World Championship and FIBA Africa Championship 2005.

References

1972 births
Living people
College men's basketball players in the United States
Harlem Globetrotters players
Montana State University–Northern alumni
Nigerian men's basketball players
Point guards
1998 FIBA World Championship players